Isaiah is the self-titled debut studio album by Isaiah, the winner of the eighth season of The X Factor Australia, released through Sony Music Australia on 9 December 2016. The album was preceded by the lead single "It's Gotta Be You", which debuted at number 26 on the ARIA Singles Chart. The album features re-recorded studio tracks of some of the songs he performed on the show including his winning single, "It's Gotta Be You".

Track listing

Charts

Weekly charts

Release history

References

2016 albums
Sony Music Australia albums